Rawdon Henry McKinnon  (1910–1989) was an Australian professional rugby league footballer, coach and administrator.

Background
McKinnon was born in Tamworth in 1910, the son of Henry and Agnes McKinnon.

Playing career
A prop-forward, he played for North Sydney for ten seasons between 1936 and 1945, including the 1943 Grand Final loss to Newtown then devoted a lifetime of service to the club.

Post playing
After retiring as a player, McKinnon coached North Sydney's first grade team in 1949, and then became involved with administration at the Bears until his retirement as Club President in 1979. He is also the father of former North Sydney, Manly-Warringah Sea Eagles and Australian representative prop-forward Don McKinnon.

A life member of North Sydney and the NSWRFL, Harry McKinnon was also awarded the Order of the British Empire Medal in 1971.

McKinnon died on 15 October 1989, aged 79.

References

1910 births
1989 deaths
Australian rugby league administrators
Australian rugby league players
Date of birth missing
North Sydney Bears coaches
North Sydney Bears players
Rugby league players from New South Wales
Rugby league props